Nikolsk is a rural locality (a selo) in Tunkinsky District, Republic of Buryatia, Russia. The population was 125 as of 2010. There are 2 streets.

Geography 
Nikolsk is located 37 km east of Kyren (the district's administrative centre) by road. Tunka is the nearest rural locality.

References 

Rural localities in Tunkinsky District